Louis Mark (December 21, 1914 – October 24, 1961) was a professional American football player who played offensive lineman for four seasons for the Brooklyn Dodgers and Boston Yanks.

1914 births
Players of American football from New York City
American football centers
NC State Wolfpack football players
Brooklyn Dodgers (NFL) players
Boston Yanks players
1961 deaths